The Heritage Conservation Committee under HUDA was formed by state government in 1981 to retain architectural, historical and social value of buildings. Hyderabad Urban Development Authority has listed almost 160 buildings in Hyderabad in Telangana state as heritage structures. Almost 70% of heritage buildings are in private hands. Heritage structures include buildings, monuments, rock structures etc.

The buildings are graded as Grade I, Grade II & Grade III. However, experts feel due to lack of support from the state government it has become difficult to preserve the status of these buildings. Various buildings such as Ravi Bar, Adil Alam Mansion, Central Building Division & Devdi Ranachand – Ahotichand have been demolished but the names of these buildings are still being retained in the list.

List of Heritage buildings as per HUDA
Following are the list of the heritage buildings in Hyderabad recognized by HUDA. This list is constantly upgraded by HUDA. The buildings proposed by HUDA are to be approved by the state government.()

Heritage rock formations in Hyderabad
In addition to various buildings, INTACH has classified various rock formation under heritage category. These are

See also

 Heritage conservation
 Architectural conservation
 Sustainable preservation
 World Heritage Site

References

External links

"A Guide to Architecture in Hyderabad, Deccan, India", by Omar Khalidi
 Heritage Capital Hyderabad
 Photo gallery of heritage buildings in Hyderabad
 63rd Meeting Minutes 
 Society to Save Rocks
 Heritage Conservation in Hyderabad

 
 
Heritage organizations
Cultural heritage of India
Culture of Hyderabad, India